John Sheehan (5 July 1844 – 12 June 1885) was a 19th-century New Zealand politician. He was the first New Zealand-born Member of Parliament elected by a general electorate (rather than a Māori electorate) and he was the first New Zealand-born person to hold cabinet rank.

Biography

Early life and career
Sheehan was born in Auckland in 1844. He was educated at St Peter's School under the guidance of his teacher, Richard O'Sullivan and where he knew another later Cabinet Minister, Joseph Tole.

Political career

He was the Minister of Justice and the Minister of Māori Affairs from 1877 to 1879. He then represented Tauranga from a by-election on 22 May  until he died shortly after on 12 June.

A fluent Maori speaker and a lawyer, he is noted for his efforts with the Repudiation Movement in the 1870s to solve land issues on behalf of Hawkes Bay Maori chiefs who claimed large European land holders, such as McLean, had acquired land improperly. The Repudiation Movement failed but Sheehan gained a positive reputation with Maori leaders. In 1877 he became Native Minister in the Grey Government. He tried to negotiate land deals in Taranaki with  iwi leaders and, in respect of the King Country, with King Tawhaio, but failed. However, during these meetings he discovered that Rewi Maniapoto wanted to sell land and negotiated land sales to Europeans in the King Country that the government hoped would speed up assimilation. Sheehan negotiated unsuccessfully with Te Whiti whose base of Parihaka was destroyed by the Armed Constabulary in November 1881 after Sheehan had ceased to hold ministerial office (in 1879). Sheehan was also active in promoting secular education and widening the franchise but he wanted only one system of Parliamentary representation, the abolition of separate Maori seats and the end of plural voting. He was one of the first ministers to advocate breaking up of the large runholder monopolies which he believed had created a social elite at the expense of the normal citizen.

Death
Sheehan died of pneumonia and cirrhosis of the liver in Petane (now Bay View) on 12 June 1885 aged 40 years. In 1890, his widow, Lucy Caroline Sheehan, married Herbert Samuel Wardell, previously a resident magistrate of Wellington. She was given away by John Nathaniel Wilson.

Notes

References

1844 births
1885 deaths
Burials at Symonds Street Cemetery
Members of the Cabinet of New Zealand
Members of the New Zealand House of Representatives
People educated at St Peter's College, Auckland
Independent MPs of New Zealand
Unsuccessful candidates in the 1884 New Zealand general election
New Zealand MPs for North Island electorates
New Zealand people of Irish descent
19th-century New Zealand politicians
Parihaka
Justice ministers of New Zealand